The Centre for Industry Education Collaboration (CIEC) is a British education resource for information about the chemical industry in the UK.

History
The organisation was set up jointly by the Chemical Industries Association and the University of York in 1988 as the Chemical Industry Education Centre; it changed its name in 2014.

In June 2016 it won the Royal Society of Chemistry's Inspiration and Industry Award.

Function
Research has shown that the ages from 10–14 are when children lose interest in science; the organisation seeks to have up-to-date course material for secondary school teachers that can invigorate science teaching.

It organises visits for schools to local chemical companies.

Structure
It is headquartered in the Chemistry department of the University of York. It is a not-for-profit organisation, and is funded by companies in the British chemical industry. It has charitable status.

See also
 BP Education Service
 National Centre for Computing Education, also at the University of York
 National Centre for Biotechnology Education, at the University of Reading
 Science education in England

References

External links
 CIEC
 University of York
 Primary school resources

1988 establishments in England
Charities based in North Yorkshire
Chemical industry in the United Kingdom
Chemistry education
Chemistry organizations
Organisations based in York
Science and technology in North Yorkshire
Scientific organizations established in 1988
University of York